This is a list of recipients of the United Arab Emirates Health Foundation Prize awarded by World Health Organization (WHO).

The prize was established in 1993 under the directive of HM Sheikh Zayed Bin Sultan Al Nahayyan (1918–2004). The prize consists of a certified award, a plaque, and up to $40,000 USD. The prize can be awarded to more than one person or institution that has made an outstanding contribution to health development.

List of recipients

See also 

 List of Ihsan Doğramacı Family Health Foundation Prize laureates
 List of Léon Bernard Foundation Prize laureates
 List of Sasakawa Health Prize laureates
 List of Sheikh Sabah Al-Ahmad Al-Jaber Al-Sabah Prize laureates

 List of Dr LEE Jong-wook Memorial Prize for Public Health laureates
 List of Dr A.T. Shousha Foundation Prize and Fellowship laureates
 List of The State of Kuwait Prize for the Control of Cancer, Cardiovascular Diseases and Diabetes in the Eastern Mediterranean Region laureates
 List of Jacques Parisot Foundation Fellowship laureates
 List of The Darling Foundation Prize laureates

References 

World Health Organization
Public health
United Arab Emirates Health Foundation Prize laureates